Eskandarian and its variant Iskenderian is the surname of:

 Alecko Eskandarian, (born 1982), Iranian-American football (soccer) player
 Andranik Eskandarian, (born 1951), Iranian-American football (soccer) player
 Ed Iskenderian, (born 1921), Armenian-American high performance automotive parts manufacturer
 Mary Ellen Iskenderian, president and CEO of Women's World Banking
 Vartkes Iskenderian, founder of Zankou Chicken in California